Earl of Pembroke is a title in the Peerage of England. 

It may also refer to:
Earl of Pembroke, tall ship
HMS Endeavour, launched as the collier Earl of Pembroke
Earl of Pembroke's Men, Elizabethan-era playing company
Earl of Pembroke's Armour, suit of armour currently at the Royal Ontario Museum